Fountain Lake School District 18 (FLSD)  is a school district headquartered in unincorporated Garland County, Arkansas, with a Hot Springs postal address but outside of the city limits. 

Fountain Lake, portions of Hot Springs Village, and small sections of northern Hot Springs are in the district limits.

The district's boundaries extend into Saline County, where the district serves additional sections of Hot Springs Village.

Schools
 Fountain Lake High School
 Fountain Lake Middle School
 Fountain Lake Elementary School

References

External links
 Official district website

Education in Garland County, Arkansas
Education in Saline County, Arkansas
School districts in Arkansas